Coelotrochus chathamensis is a species of small sea snail, a marine gastropod mollusc in the family Trochidae, the top snails or top shells.

Description
The length of the shell varies between eight mm and 10 mm. The small shell has a conical shape, the sides are straight or slightly convex.. The angle of the spire is 70°. The five, rarely six, whorls are flat with an elevated upper edge, and, together with the base, spirally striated. The pointed protoconch is regularly conical, and consists of about two whorls. These are not marked off from the succeeding whorl. This one is, smooth, with two or three spiral red bands. The last two whorls increase rapidly in size. They are flat to slightly convex above, concave below before reaching the strong and prominent cingulum. The body whorl has a distinct peripheric keel. 

The sculpture consists of five to six low spiral threads, the lower and upper margins much elevated, especially the former. They are crossed by broad nodulous radiate ribs, which, however, do not extend over the lower half of the whorl. These ribs are often obsolete. The suture is superficial, with a nodulous border below. The false umbilicus is narrow and not very deep. The oblique aperture is rhomboidal. The outer and basal lip are a little convex, forming a sharp angle where they meet. 

The oblique columella is slightly concave. It has an almost imperceptible posterior fold, but the anterior portion is nearly smooth. The axial cavity is small and smooth. The color of the shell is white, buff with pink or oblique brownish purple stripes or spots. The flat base of the shell is white with interrupted pink, subequal spiral lines.

Distribution
This marine species is endemic to New Zealand and occurs the Chatham Islands, Southern North Island, Stewart Islands and the Auckland Islands.

References

 Powell A. W. B., New Zealand Mollusca, William Collins Publishers Ltd, Auckland, New Zealand 1979 
 Marshall B.A. 1998. A review of the Recent Trochini of New Zealand (Mollusca: Gastropoda: Trochidae). Molluscan Research 19(1): 73-106

chathamensis
Gastropods of New Zealand
Gastropods described in 1873